Jennifer Barnhart (born March 11, 1972) is an American actress and puppeteer, with a portfolio of television and theatre performances.

Biography
Barnhart was born and grew up in Hamden, Connecticut. She graduated from the University of Connecticut with a Bachelor of Fine Arts in acting with a concentration in puppetry.

Puppetry career
In 1996, Barnhart began her puppeteer career performing on Once Upon a Tree performing Mara the Beaver and Mrs. Peeper the Owl. She made her Broadway debut in 2003 and is a featured performer in the Tony Award-winning musical Avenue Q, in which she also appeared Off-Broadway. She was a regular puppeteer on the Nickelodeon series Oobi, playing Mrs. Johnson and various incidental characters. She also stars as Cleo on PBS's literacy education series, Between the Lions, and performed the puppetry for Kanga and Owl on Disney Channel's The Book of Pooh. She is a Sesame Street Muppet performer who took over the roles of Mama Bear in 2001 and Gladys the Cow in 2002.

Barnhart also worked as a puppeteer in Johnny and the Sprites, a Disney Channel children's show created by her Avenue Q co-star John Tartaglia.

As of season 46 of Sesame Street, she performs the role of Zoe, following the retirement of Fran Brill in 2014.

Acting career
She appeared on screen as a puppeteer in the "Web" episode of Law & Order: SVU in May 2006. In regional theatre, she played the angel in Angels in America (Gallery Players), Olivia in Twelfth Night, and Cassie in Rumors (Connecticut Repertory Theatre). In 2011 she appeared as police officer Randy Osteen in Tracy Letts's new play "Superior Donuts" at the Arden Theatre in Philadelphia. In 2010, she portrayed Chicago Police Department detective Lorna Diamond in the Law & Order: SVU episode, "Behave".

TV credits
 Helpsters, 2019-present
 Julie's Greenroom, 2017-2019
 The Chica Show, 2012-2014
 Law & Order: SVU, 2010
 Lomax, the Hound of Music, 2008
 Johnny and the Sprites, 2007
 Law & Order: SVU, 2006
 Exposing the Order of the Serpentine, 2006
 Sesame Street, 2001–present
 Smart Cookies, 2016
 Oobi, 2000–2005
 The Book of Pooh, 2001
 Between the Lions, 2000-2010 
 Bear in the Big Blue House, 1997–1998
 Once Upon a Tree, 1996

References

External links
 
 
 Interview with Jennifer Barnhart at Playbill.com

Living people
American stage actresses
American puppeteers
University of Connecticut alumni
American television actresses
Sesame Street Muppeteers
People from Hamden, Connecticut
1972 births
Muppet performers